These are the yearly results of the Milwaukee Panthers men's basketball team.

Year-by-year (1956–present)

References

Milwaukee
Milwaukee Panthers basketball seasons